Ayatsuji is a family name in the Japanese language and may refer to:

 Yukito Ayatsuji, a pen name for Naoyuki Uchida (born 1960), a Japanese writer.

Fictional characters:
 Ayase Ayatsuji, one of the supporting characters in the anime/manga Chivalry of a Failed Knight
 Kaito Ayatsuji, the father of Ayase Ayatsuji, one of the supporting characters in the anime/manga Chivalry of a Failed Knight
 Haruka Ayatsuji, one of the supporting characters in the anime/manga World Trigger
 Kinu Ayatsuji, one of the supporting characters in the anime/manga Sumomomo Momomo
 Serika Ayatsuji, one of the supporting characters in the video game Koi Q Bu!
 Tsukasa Ayatsuji, one of the 6 lead females of the anime/manga Amagami SS
 Yukari Ayatsuji, the older sister of Tsukasa Ayatsuji, one of the supporting characters in the anime/manga Amagami SS

Japanese-language surnames